Laskarpara is a census town in the Kumargram CD block in the Alipurduar subdivision of the Alipurduar district in the state of West Bengal, India.

Geography

Location

Area overview
Alipurduar district is covered by two maps. It extends to the eastern end of the Dooars in West Bengal. The area is largely-forested, undulating country with numerous rivers flowing down from the outer ranges of the Himalayas in Bhutan. It is a predominantly rural area with 79.38% of the population living in the rural areas. The district has one municipal town and 20 census towns so 20.62% of the population lives in the urban areas. The scheduled castes and scheduled tribes collectively form more than half the population in all six community development blocks in the district. There is a high concentration of tribal people (scheduled tribes) in the three northern blocks of the district.

Note: The map alongside presents some of the notable locations in the subdivision. All places marked in the map are linked in the larger full screen map.

Demographics
As per the 2011 Census of India, Laskarpara had a total population of 7,137. There were 3,706 (52%) males and 3,431 (48%) females. There were 752 persons in the age range of 0 to six years. The total number of literate people in Laskarpara was 5,544 (86.83% of the population is over six years).

Infrastructure
It had 700 domestic electric connections. There were four medicine shops in the town. Among educational facilities, it had five primary schools and a middle school. The closest senior secondary school, in Chakchaka, is a similar distance. Laskarpara had one cinema.

Education
Saheed Kshudiram College was established at Kamakhyaguri in 1996. Affiliated with the University of North Bengal, it offers courses in arts and science.

Healthcare
With 30 beds, Kamakhyaguri Rural Hospital is the major government medical facility in the Kumargram CD block.

References

Cities and towns in Alipurduar district